Sarah Elizabeth Medland  is Professor and Psychiatric Genetics Group Leader at the QIMR Berghofer Medical Research Institute in Herston, Brisbane, Australia. She played a major role in the development of the ENIGMA brain imaging consortium.

Honours and awards
In 2010, Medland received the Queensland Young Tall Poppy Science Award from the Australian Institute of Policy and Science. In 2011, she received the Fuller & Scott Award from the Behavior Genetics Association. In 2015, she was awarded the Theodore Reich Young Investigator Award from the International Society of Psychiatric Genetics. In 2017, she received the Ruth Stephens Gani Medal from the Australian Academy of Science. In October 2019 Medland was elected Fellow of the Australian Academy of Health and Medical Sciences (FAHMS). Also in 2019 she was elected Fellow of the Academy of the Social Sciences in Australia, while in 2020 she was awarded the Medal of the Order of Australia for "service to medical research in the field of genetics". She was elected a Fellow of the Australian Academy of Science in 2022.

References

External links
Faculty page

Living people
Australian women scientists
Australian geneticists
Psychiatric geneticists
Australian women psychiatrists
University of Queensland alumni
Women geneticists
Year of birth missing (living people)
Recipients of the Medal of the Order of Australia
Fellows of the Australian Academy of Science
Fellows of the Academy of the Social Sciences in Australia

Fellows of the Australian Academy of Health and Medical Sciences